Wallu Q'asa (Quechua wallu earless, someone whose ears are amputated, q'asa mountain pass, Hispanicized spelling Huallojasa) is a mountain in the Chunta mountain range in the Andes of Peru, about  high. It is located in the Huancavelica Region, Castrovirreyna Province, on the border of the districts of Chupamarca and Aurahuá. 
Wallu Q'asa lies northeast of Wichinka Lake.

References

Mountains of Huancavelica Region
Mountains of Peru